In enzymology, an acetate kinase (diphosphate) is an enzyme that catalyzes the chemical reaction

diphosphate + acetate  phosphate + acetyl phosphate

Thus, the two substrates of this enzyme are diphosphate and acetate, whereas its two products are phosphate and acetyl phosphate.

This enzyme belongs to the family of transferases, specifically those transferring phosphorus-containing groups (phosphotransferases) with a carboxy group as acceptor.  The systematic name of this enzyme class is diphosphate:acetate phosphotransferase. This enzyme is also called pyrophosphate-acetate phosphotransferase.  This enzyme participates in pyruvate metabolism.

References

 

EC 2.7.2
Enzymes of unknown structure